Erupa gyges is a moth in the family Crambidae. It was described by Herbert Druce in 1900. It is found in Colombia.

References

Erupini
Moths described in 1900